BFPP may refer to:

 Bilateral frontoparietal polymicrogyria, genetic disease 
 GPR56, GPCR
 Bulletin Français de la Pêche et de la Pisciculture